Sceloporus cyanogenys, the bluechinned roughscaled lizard or blue spiny lizard, is a species of lizard in the family Phrynosomatidae. It is found in Texas in the United States and Mexico.

References

Sceloporus
Reptiles of the United States
Reptiles of Mexico
Reptiles described in 1885
Taxa named by Edward Drinker Cope